Urakusai Nagahide (Japanese: 有楽斎　長秀), was a designer of ukiyo-e style Japanese woodblock prints who was active from about 1804 to about 1848.  He is also known as Yūrakusai Nagahide (有楽斎　長秀), Nakamura Nagahide (中邑　長秀 or 中村　長秀), Chōshū (長秀), and as Chōshūsai (長秀斎).  “Nagahide” and “Chōshū” are written with the same kanji.  The ending “sai” means studio or hall, and is added or omitted at will by many Japanese artists.

Nagahide worked in both Kyoto and Osaka.  His early prints resemble those of his teacher Ryūkōsai Jokei, but were also influenced by Shōkōsai Hanbei.  Such a radical change occurred in Nagahide’s style that some scholars believe that the body of works signed “Nagahide” may actually have been created by two different artists.  From the 1810s to the 1830s, Nagahide was the most prolific designer of stencil prints (kappazuri) depicting the annual costume parade in the Gion district of Kyoto, and he continued producing kappazuri long after full-color woodblock prints (nishiki-e) had become the standard for Japanese woodblock prints.  His students include Nagashige, Hidekatsu, Hidekuni, Hidemari, and Naniwa Nagakuni.

Gallery

Notes

References
 Keyes, Roger S. & Keiko Mizushima, The Theatrical World of Osaka Prints, Philadelphia, Philadelphia Museum of Art, 1973, 270.
 Lane, Richard. (1978).  Images from the Floating World, The Japanese Print. Oxford: Oxford University Press. ;  OCLC 5246796
 Newland, Amy Reigle. (2005). Hotei Encyclopedia of Japanese Woodblock Prints.  Amsterdam: Hotei. ;  OCLC 61666175 
 Roberts, Laurance P. (1976). A Dictionary of Japanese Artists. New York: Weatherhill. ;  OCLC 2005932

External links

 Museum of Fine Arts, Boston:  digitized print

Ukiyo-e artists